Leon Wiegard (born 22 May 1939) is an Australian water polo player. He competed at the 1964 Summer Olympics and the 1972 Summer Olympics. He was awarded with the Medal of the Order of Australia in 2005. In 2012, he was inducted into the Water Polo Australia Hall of Fame.

References

External links
 

1939 births
Living people
Australian male water polo players
Olympic water polo players of Australia
Water polo players at the 1964 Summer Olympics
Water polo players at the 1972 Summer Olympics
Place of birth missing (living people)
Recipients of the Medal of the Order of Australia
Fitzroy Football Club administrators